Aifa Azman (born 18 December 2001 in Kedah) is a Malaysian professional squash player. As of December 2021, she was ranked number 36 in the world.

Career
She won the 2018 Malaysian Squash Tour II and 2021 Malaysian Open Squash Championships professional tournaments. She became the youngest Malaysian Winner on the PSA Tour. 

She also competed at the 2018 Commonwealth Games which was also her maiden Commonwealth Games appearance.

In 2022, she won a bronze at the 2022 Women's World Team Squash Championships.

References

2001 births
Living people
Malaysian female squash players
Squash players at the 2018 Commonwealth Games
Commonwealth Games competitors for Malaysia
Asian Games medalists in squash
Squash players at the 2018 Asian Games
Asian Games bronze medalists for Malaysia
Medalists at the 2018 Asian Games
21st-century Malaysian women